Michael Steinore (1901 – February 19, 1961) was an American sound engineer. He won an Academy Award for Best Special Effects and was nominated for two more in the same category. He worked on more than 60 films during his career.

Selected filmography
Steinore won an Academy Award for Best Special Effects and was nominated for two more:

Won
 Green Dolphin Street (1947)

Nominated
 Stand By for Action (1942)
 They Were Expendable (1945)

References

External links

1901 births
1961 deaths
American audio engineers
Best Visual Effects Academy Award winners
People from Salt Lake City
20th-century American engineers